The Royal Canadian Henley Regatta started in 1880 as the first championship for the newly formed Canadian Amateur Rowing Association.

History
It changed venues often until 1903, when it was decided to hold it at St. Catharines Port Dalhousie's Martindale Pond hosted by the St. Catharines Rowing Club permanently.

Originally the race was 1 mile 550 yards long (2112m), the same distance as the Henley Royal Regatta in England at the time.  The pond was an ideal location because the level of the water could be controlled.  Wooden grandstands were built, and in 1947, women raced for the first time.

In 1964, the distance was changed to 2000 metres, the current standard distance for international competition.  The facilities were completely redone in 1966, and in 1972, women's races became a permanent, rather than exhibition event. In 1999, the facilities were again upgraded for the 1999 World Rowing Championships. 

The Royal Canadian Henley Regatta has welcomed many famous spectators, including Grace Kelly, former Prime Minister The Right Honourable Pierre Elliott Trudeau and former Prime Minister The Right Honourable Jean Chrétien.

The Ontario Heritage Trust erected a plaque honouring the Royal Canadian Henley Regatta at the entrance to the Henley Regatta Course Grandstand, Main Street, St. Catharines.  "Competitive rowing became popular in Canada in the 1860s, and in 1880 the first Royal Canadian Henley Regatta for international oarsmen was held in Toronto. In 1903, a section of the old Welland Canal at Port Dalhousie was chosen as the permanent site for this popular sporting competition."

See also
 List of Canadian organizations with royal patronage
 CSSRA rowing: High School Rowing at the Royal Canadian Henley Course
 Royal Canadian Henley Rowing Course

References

External links

Official Site
Historic images Niagara Falls Public Library (Ont.)

Rowing competitions in Canada
Annual sporting events in Canada
Recurring sporting events established in 1880
1880 establishments in Canada